Meredith Grace Beard (born May 10, 1979) is an American former professional soccer player. A forward, she represented the Carolina Courage and the Washington Freedom of Women's United Soccer Association (WUSA). She won three caps for the United States national team.

College career
As a senior at North Carolina, she won the Honda Sports Award as the nation's top soccer player.

Club career
Beard was the Carolina Courage's second draft pick ahead of the inaugural 2001 season of the Women's United Soccer Association (WUSA). Ahead of the 2002 season she joined the Washington Freedom as a free agent. She was mainly a substitute at the Freedom, as coach Jim Gabarra preferred to field celebrated forwards Mia Hamm and Abby Wambach.

In 2003, Beard's Freedom team won the Founders Cup, but she did not play in the post-season fixtures. When WUSA subsequently folded, she began working for a kitchen and bathroom showroom.

International career
In February 1999, Beard won her first cap for the United States national team. She played the second half of a 3–1 behind closed doors win over Finland in Orlando. She played two more matches for the national team in January 2001, both against China.

Personal life
In February 2002 she married Ryan Beard.

References

External links

 Profile at Women's United Soccer Association
 Profile at North Carolina Tar Heels

Living people
1979 births
American women's soccer players
United States women's international soccer players
North Carolina Tar Heels women's soccer players
Soccer players from Texas
Women's association football forwards
Washington Freedom players
Carolina Courage players
Women's United Soccer Association players